is a Japanese screenwriter.

Career
He studied under Hiroshi Kashiwabara, Takuya Nishioka, and Yumiko Inoue, before working as a screenwriter. He is a member of the Japan Writers Guild.

Filmography

Screenplay

 OneChanbara (2008)
 Wangan Midnight (2009)
 Psycho Shark (2009)

Teleplay

 Sagishi Ririko (2009)

Anime

 Golgo 13 (2009)
 Tegamibachi (2010)
 Detective Conan (2012-)

External links
 Japan Writers Guild profile 
 Official Website
 

Japanese screenwriters
Anime screenwriters
1971 births
Living people